Rassolino is a rural locality (a village) in Kukushtanskoye Rural Settlement, Permsky District, Perm Krai, Russia. The population was 23 as of 2010.

Geography 
Rassolino is located 46 km southeast of Perm (the district's administrative centre) by road. Verkhnyaya Rassolnaya is the nearest rural locality.

References 

Rural localities in Permsky District